Peter Kopecký is a Slovak romanist and politician.

Previously the Slovak Ambassador to Romania and Moldova and Rector of Comenius University in Bratislava, he is now Assistant Director of the Institute of European Studies and International Relations at Comenius.

He is also leader of the Slovak pro-plebiscite movement Priama demokracia - Hnutie domova (PD-HD) and vice president of the pan-European eurosceptic network EUDemocrats. In January 2009, Kopecký announced the foundation of a new party under the name Libertas Slovensko which was supposed to be the Slovak branch of the pan-European eurosceptic alliance Libertas.eu running for the 2009 European Parliament elections. In spite of public advances the EUDemocrats announced in late March that Kopecký would instead head the electoral list of the small but established Agrarian and Countryside Party. In the election, he could capture no more than 0.45% of the votes.

Peter Kopecky holds a PhD in History and Romanic Languages and is decorated with the "National Merit Order, Large Cross Rank" of Romania.

References 

20th-century Slovak historians
Living people
Agrarian and Countryside Party politicians
Ambassadors of Slovakia to Romania
Ambassadors of Slovakia to Moldova
Year of birth missing (living people)